Arrendamientos Aéreos is an airline based in Panama City, Panama. It operates charter passenger services throughout Panama. Its main base is Albrook "Marcos A. Gelabert" International Airport, Panama City.

Fleet
The Arrendamientos Aéreos fleet consists of the following aircraft (as of December 2019):

References

External links
Official website

Airlines of Panama
Airlines established in 1999
Panamanian brands
1999 establishments in Panama
Companies based in Panama City